The Dutch National Track Championships are the set of Dutch national championship events for the various disciplines and distances in track cycling. They are organized by the KNWU. There are competitions of various track cycling disciplines in age, gender and disability categories. Women's events are shorter than men's. Championships are open to all licensed riders.

The winner of a national championship discipline receives a gold medal and a national jersey. Silver and bronze medals are awarded to the second and third place contestants. National champions wear their national jersey until the following year's championship, but they may wear it only in the type of event in which they won it. Former champions can wear rainbow cuffs to their everyday jerseys.

Disciplines
In many years not all the disciplines were contested during the same event.

Competitions

References

Women's Omnium
Women's Scratch
Women's Individual Pursuit
Women's Points Race

 
National track cycling championships